The Agricultural Research Institute of Ontario is a provincial Crown corporation, established in 1962, by the ARIO Act, to "advocate areas of research for the betterment of agriculture, veterinary medicine and consumer studies" and "increase the production efficiency and marketing of agricultural products by stimulating interest in research".

It is located adjacent to the University of Guelph campus.

References

Agriculture in Ontario
Crown corporations of Ontario
Government agencies established in 1962
Organizations based in Guelph
Government research